Fumestan (also Romanized as Fūmestān and Foomestan) is a village in Behdasht Rural District, Kushk-e Nar District, Parsian County, Hormozgan Province, Iran. At the 2006 census, its population was 835, in 193 families.

References 

Populated places in Parsian County